William Creed Wampler Sr. (April 21, 1926 – May 23, 2012) was an American businessman and Republican politician who served multiple terms in the United States House of Representatives.

Early and family life
Born in Pennington Gap near the center of Lee County, Virginia, on April 21, 1926, to hardware store proprietor John Sevier Wampler and his schoolteacher wife, the former Lilian May Wolfe, the child nicknamed Bill Wampler attended the public schools in Bristol, Virginia. He had two older brothers (John S. Wampler Sr. and James A. Wampler) and as the Great Depression ended the family had a live-in maid/lodger.

When Wampler became old enough to enlist, he did, in the United States Navy on May 21, 1943. Thus, during World War II, he served as a seaman for twenty-eight months until discharged on September 29, 1945. He then continued as a member of the Naval Reserve, V-6 for many years. Using the GI Bill, Wampler resumed his education and graduated from Virginia Polytechnic Institute in Blacksburg, Virginia with a degree in political science in 1948. He then began studying law at the University of Virginia from 1948 to 1950, but left before receiving a degree.

He married Mary Elizabeth Baker on August 23, 1953, in Scott, Tennessee, and they had daughter, Barbara Wampler, and a son, William Creed Wampler, Jr. (who would later represent Virginia's 40th Senatorial District) before divorcing in 1976. On July 25, 1977, he remarried in the Episcopal Church in Bristol, to Mary Lee McCall Frackelton.

Career
Wampler worked as a reporter for The Tennessean in 1950 and 1951. He then became a reporter and editorial writer for Big Stone Gap (Virginia) Post in 1951. Wampler then moved to Bristol, Virginia on the Tennessee line where he worked as reporter and copy editor for the Bristol Herald Courier in 1951 and 1952.

Wampler was a member of the board of visitors of Emory and Henry College in Emory, Virginia and was Republican assistant campaign manager for  elections in 1948. He was also the president of the Young Republican Federation of Virginia in 1950 and served as keynote speaker and permanent chairman of the 9th district Republican Convention the same year.

Wampler won election as a Republican to the 83rd Congress (January 3, 1953 – January 3, 1955), during which time he was its youngest member.

After losing his campaign for reelection in 1954 to the 84th Congress, Wampler received a job working for the U.S. Atomic Energy Commission during the administration of President Dwight D. Eisenhower, which he held from January 1955 to March 1956.

However, Wampler returned to Virginia to assist at the family furniture and carpeting businesses as well as to campaign again. However, he lost again in 1956 to the 85th Congress to William Pat Jennings, receiving only 45% of the vote.

Thus Wampler worked as vice president and general manager of Wampler Brothers Furniture Company in Bristol from 1957 to 1960, then became the vice president and general manager of Wampler Carpet Company from 1961 to 1966. He also worked on the campaigns of other Republican candidates.

As the Byrd Organization collapsed along with its policy of massive resistance to the 1954 and 1955 school desegregation decisions of the United States Supreme Court in Brown v. Board of Education, Wampler won election to the 90th Congress, defeating William Pat Jennings by winning 53.7% of the votes cast. Jennings had defeated four other Republican candidates for the seat in the interim. Wampler was re-elected to the seven succeeding Congresses, serving from January 3, 1967 – January 3, 1983. He won re-election in 1968 with 59.9% of the vote, in 1970 with 62.5%, 1972 with 71.9% and after the Watergate scandal in 1974 narrowly won with 50.9%, then increased his margin against the same opponent in 1976 to 57.3%. Wampler won in 1978 with 61.9% of the votes cast and in 1980 won with 69.4%. However, Wampler narrowly lost his re-election campaign in 1982 to Democrat Frederick C. Boucher, who won 50.4% of the votes cast. In Congress, Wampler advocated for Appalachian coal miners, and also served on the Agriculture Committee.

Wampler then stopped running for public office on his own behalf, but continued active in politics behind the scenes. His son, William C. Wampler, Jr., also a Republican from Bristol, served in the Senate of Virginia from 1988 until 2012.

Death and legacy
Wampler died in Bristol on May 23, 2012, and is buried at the Mountain View Cemetery and Chapel Mausoleum in Bristol.

References

 Retrieved on 2008-03-28

1926 births
2012 deaths
United States Navy personnel of World War II
People from Pennington Gap, Virginia
Journalists from Virginia
United States Navy sailors
University of Virginia School of Law alumni
Virginia Tech alumni
Republican Party members of the United States House of Representatives from Virginia
20th-century American politicians
United States Navy reservists